Acuitzio del Canje is a town in the Mexican state of Michoacán. It serves as the municipal seat for the surrounding municipality of Acuitzio.

The area was originally settled in pre-Hispanic times. By 1620, it was a community of 20 families, with a hospital.
In the early years of Mexican independence, an ayuntamiento was established there.

Name
"Acuitzio" is a word of Purépecha origin that means "place of snakes". 
The epithet "del Canje" (literally: "of the exchange") refers to an exchange of prisoners of war that took place in the town on 5 December 1865, during the French Intervention. On 16 December 1901, the State Congress 
enacted legislation for Acuitzio's name to be changed to Acuitzio del Canje.

References
Recorrido por Acuitzio del Canje 
Acuitzio Enciclopedia de los Municipios de México (INAFED)
Acuitzio (municipal government web page)

Populated places in Michoacán